The 2003–04 FIS Ski Jumping World Cup  was the 25th World Cup season of ski jumping. It began on 28 November 2003 at Ruka in Kuusamo, Finland, and finished on 14 March 2004 at Holmenkollbakken in Oslo, Norway. The defending champion from the previous three seasons was Adam Małysz. The overall World Cup was won by Janne Ahonen, who gained his first title. Roar Ljøkelsøy placed second, with Bjørn Einar Romøren in third. The Nations Cup was won by Norway.

Calendar

Individual events

Team events

World Cup Standings

Overall

Nations Cup

Medal table

Notes

References

External links

World cup
World cup
FIS Ski Jumping World Cup